Mario Vazquez is the debut studio album by American singer Mario Vazquez. It was released by Stiefel Entertainment and Arista Records on September 26, 2006 in the United States. The album did not fare well in its first week on sale, coming in at number 80 on US Billboard 200, selling slightly more than 12,000 units. In France, Mario Vazquez peaked at number 104 on the French Albums Chart.

Critical reception

AllMusic's Andy Kellman said that, "While there are a few standouts on this album, Vazquez sounds tentative and too conscious about making the right moves, and the variety of material must be an experiment to find out where he fits best, including soppy adult contemporary ("4 the 1," "One Shot"), harmless ska-inflected pop ("Don't Lie"), and marvelously horrible club-oriented garbage ("Cohiba")." He concluded that, "[T]he results next time should be significantly improved if Vazquez can work with a smaller team that can give him a more personalized and focused set of songs." Ericka Souter, writing for People, also criticized the various genre-hopping throughout the album but gave credit to the first two tracks for properly showcasing Vazquez's vocal talents and charisma, saying that he's "still worthy of a little idol worship." Julianne Shepherd of Vibe praised the Latin pop tracks for displaying Vazquez's tenor but found diversions away from it make his voice lack style. She concluded by advising Vazquez that, "Until he can personalize every track, he'll still be just another Idol: an able singer belting someone else's songs."

Track listing

Notes
 denotes vocal producer
 denotes co-producer

Charts

References

2006 debut albums
Mario Vazquez albums
Albums produced by Jim Jonsin
Albums produced by Scott Storch
Albums produced by Stargate
Albums produced by the Underdogs (production team)